Pantops Mountain is a mountain in Albemarle County, Virginia, directly east of Charlottesville across the Rivanna River. and north of U.S. Route 250.

In 1777, Thomas Jefferson purchased some of the land for use as a farm.  According to Edward C. Mead, "Pantops--formerly written 'Pant-Ops'--was therefore, so named by Mr. Jefferson from two Greek words...meaning 'all-seeing,' significant of the extended view from its summit."

References

Landforms of Albemarle County, Virginia
Mountains of Virginia